Deepal Warakagoda (born 1965) is a prominent Sri Lankan ornithologist. His early working career was in electronics, but for many years he has studied birds and also works as a professional guide for birding tours of the island. He is mostly known for his records as the ornithologist who has seen the greatest amount of species in Sri Lanka. Deepal Warakagoda is also one of the major roles of the Ceylon birds club. He works hard to conserve natural sights and fauna in Sri Lanka and has his own career experience for over 25 years.

Discoveries 
He discovered a new species of bird endemic to Sri Lanka, the Serendib Scops owl. His expertise in vocalizations had enabled him to realize that an owl he heard calling near Kitulgala rain forest was an unknown species, and he later saw this bird in January 2001 in the Sinharaja rain forest with assistance of a few. He surrounded the bird's habitat and took photographs while it was roosting under a thick bush. This new-found species of scops owl is now on the IUCN Red List. He has also identified (each for the first time) 15 new migrant species of birds in Sri Lanka, and has published a large number of articles on the avifauna of Sri Lanka.

Creations and experiences 
Warakagoda is Sri Lanka's foremost sound recordist in natural history subjects, and has produced and published the only comprehensive audio guide to the island's birds (on tape and CD). He has an unmatched knowledge of Sri Lanka's bird songs and calls. His recordings of the island's distinct bird species have played a major role in the recognition of several of them as endemic to Sri Lanka in the book Birds of South Asia. The Ripley Guide (2005) by Pamela C. Rasmussen and John C. Anderton.

Although best known for his knowledge of the avifauna of Sri Lanka, and expertise in finding and identifying birds, his knowledge extends to the island's mammals and butterflies.

Warakagoda founded the Drongo Nature Sounds Library, the only one of its kind in Sri Lanka, and is joint secretary of the Ceylon Bird Club. He is a national coordinator in Sri Lanka for the Asian Waterbird Census.
He is a founder of Bird and Wildlife Team (www.birdandwildlifeteam.com), a company specializing in natural history tours of Sri Lanka and India, and works as one of its tour leaders. He is also a leading tour guide of the organization 'Wings birds'

He is currently working on several new publications in the print and audio/video media, for the betterment of the future of bird watching in Sri Lanka.

Publications
 A field guide to the birds of Sri Lanka (2012)- by Deepal Warakagoda, Carol Inskipp, Tim Inskipp and Richard Grimmet 
A Guide to the Birds of Sri Lanka Third Edition (1998)- by G. M. Henry, revised and enlarged by Thilo W. Hoffmann, Deepal Warakagoda, and Upali Ekanayake - 
Photographic Guide to Birds of Sri Lanka (2000) - 
 The Bird Sounds of Sri Lanka. An Identification Guide Part 1 (1997, 2nd ed. 2001)   audio tape
The Bird Sounds of Sri Lanka. An Identification Guide Part 2 (1998)   audio tape
The Bird Sounds of Sri Lanka. 99 Species   (2003)   audio CD
The Bird Sounds of Sri Lanka. Habitat Edition 2005   (2005)   audio tape
Bird of Sri Lanka, MP3 sound and image collection (2008) CD-ROM – by Deepal Warakagoda and Uditha Hettige.
Bird Sounds of Sri Lanka, Vocalization and Image Guide (2008) CD-ROM – by Deepal Warakagoda and Uditha Hettige.
Indian Bird Sounds, The Indian Peninsula (2009) A set of 5 audio CDs – by C. Chappuis, F. Deroussen and D. Warakagoda.
The Bird Sounds of Sri Lanka. Habitat Edition 2017 (2017) MP3 digital album.

References

1965 births
Living people
Sri Lankan ornithologists